The 1922 Colorado gubernatorial election was held on November 7, 1922. Democratic nominee William Ellery Sweet defeated Republican nominee Benjamin Griffith with 49.64% of the vote.

Primary elections
Primary elections were held on September 12, 1922.

Democratic primary

Candidates
William Ellery Sweet, businessman
Fred A. Sabin
Benjamin L. Jefferson

Results

Republican primary

Candidates
Benjamin Griffith, former Colorado Attorney General
Earl Cooley, incumbent Lieutenant Governor

Results

General election

Candidates
Major party candidates
William Ellery Sweet, Democratic
Benjamin Griffith, Republican

Other candidates
Lauren E. Arnold, Socialist
G.F. Stevens, Farmer–Labor 
Barney Haughey, Independent

Results

References

1922
Colorado
Gubernatorial